Normanby Park Works Football Club was an English association football club based in Scunthorpe, Lincolnshire. It competed in the FA Cup for many years, firstly as Lysaghts Sports.

References

Defunct football clubs in England
Defunct football clubs in Lincolnshire
Works association football teams in England